William Taylor (14 September 1952 – 19 January 2022) was a British boxer. He competed in the men's featherweight event at the 1972 Summer Olympics. At the 1972 Summer Olympics, he defeated Lahcen Maghfour of Morocco, before losing to Jochen Bachfeld of East Germany. Taylor died on 19 January 2022, at the age of 69.

References

External links
 

1952 births
2022 deaths
Place of birth missing
Boxers at the 1972 Summer Olympics
British male boxers
Featherweight boxers
Olympic boxers of Great Britain